This is a list of books about Leonard Cohen.

2012 

 I'm Your Man: The Life of Leonard Cohen
 by Sylvie Simmons
 Ecco. 2012. (Paperback 2013)

2014 

 Leonard Cohen: An Illustrated Record
 Compiled by Editors of Plexus. United Kingdom: Plexus Publishing
 Publication Date: August, 2014

 The Wordless Leonard Cohen Songbook
 by George A. Walker, Master Engraver
 Porcupine's Quill
 Publication Date: September 2014

 Cohen - Eine Hommage
 by Thomas Kraft
 Maro Verlag, Augsburg
 Publication Date: September 2014

 Leonard Cohen Par Lui-meme
 by Jean-Dominque Brierre and Jacques Vassal
 Le Cherche Midi
 Publication Date: September 2014

 Leonard Cohen and Philosophy
 Edited by Jason Holt
 Open Court Press, Popular Culture and Philosophy Series 
 Publication Date: October 2014

 Leonard Cohen on Leonard Cohen: Interviews and Encounters
 edited by Jeff Burger. 
 Chicago Review Press/ An A Capella Book. 2014

 A Broken Hallelujah: Leonard Cohen's Secret Chord 
 by Liel Leibovitz. 
 Sandstone Press Ltd, UK/WW Norton & Co, New York. 2014.

 So Long Marianne: A Love Story
 by Kari Hesthamar. 
 Spartacus, Norway. 2014

 Leonard Cohen: Almost Young
 text by Jens Sparschuh. 
 Schirmer/Mosel Verlag, Munich, Germany. 2014

 Leonard Cohen - Everybody Knows
 by Harvey Kubernik
 Publishers: Omnibus Press (UK), Monti Publishing (Canada), Hal Leonard (USA), Knesebeck Verlag (Germany), Blume (Spain)

Footnotes 

Cohen
Books
Cohen